A flexible Videoscope or Video Borescope is an advanced type of borescope that houses a very small image sensor embedded into the tip of the scope.  The video image is relayed from the distal tip and focusable lens assembly back to the display via internal wiring.  This is unlike a traditional rigid borescope and flexible fiberscope. Rigid borescopes use hard optical relay components to transfer the image from the tip to an eyepiece and flexible fiberscopes use coherent image fiber optics to relay the image to one's eye through an eyepiece.  The image quality of a videoscope is superior to that of a fiberscope and can be compared to that of an intermediate camcorder.

Videoscopes are normally up to 10 millimeters in diameter and come in lengths up to 15 meters (49 feet,  inches).  Several integral features include an insertion probe section, an articulated tip, articulation controls (up, down, left, right) on the control handle, a lighting bundle, a high intensity external light source and cable interface with outputs to the display (LCD or CRT) and an external media recording device such as a hard disk drive or a CompactFlash card. Newer videoscopes also make use of USB flash drives or SD cards for storage. The system normally will record either live video or still photos.

As either an AC or DC portable visual inspection system, the components are designed to be compact and be hand carried without shipping cases on wheels or large boxes.

Medical equipment
Optical devices
Nondestructive testing